Elizabeth Davidson Fraser (born 29 August 1963), is a Scottish singer, songwriter and musician. Hailing from Grangemouth, Scotland, she is best known as the vocalist for the pioneering dream pop band Cocteau Twins who achieved international success primarily during the fifteen years from the mid–1980s to late 1990s. Their studio albums Victorialand (1986) and Heaven or Las Vegas (1990) both reached the top ten of the UK Album Charts, as well as other albums including Blue Bell Knoll (1988), Four-Calendar Café (1993) and Milk & Kisses (1996) charting on the Billboard 200 album charts in the United States as well as the top 20 in the UK. She also performed as part of the 4AD group This Mortal Coil, including the successful 1983 single "Song to the Siren", and as a guest with Massive Attack on their 1998 single "Teardrop". 

The album Heaven or Las Vegas was included in the book 1001 Albums You Must Hear Before You Die, and was voted number 218 in the third edition of Colin Larkin's All Time Top 1000 Albums. In 2020, Rolling Stone listed it at No. 245 in its list of the 500 Greatest Albums of All Time. Four of their studio albums reached number one on the UK Indie Chart.

When the Cocteau Twins disbanded, Fraser embarked on a moderately low key solo career and provided guest vocals for other artists. In 2000, she appeared alongside Paul Buchanan and Peter Gabriel on Later...with Jools Holland performing "Downside-Up, one of two songs she performed with Gabriel as part of the Millennium Dome Show which ran between 1 January 2000 and 31 December 2000. " She released some solo material, including singles "Underwater" (2000) and "Moses" (2009). Fraser has reportedly recorded enough material for a debut solo studio album; however, a release date or further information has not been published. In 2022, Fraser released the EP Sun's Signature, which includes a re-worked version of her 2000 single release "Underwater". In May 2022, Fraser and former band mates Robin Guthrie and Simon Raymonde were awarded the Visionary Award by The Ivors Academy.

Her distinctive style has received much critical praise in her four-decade career; Melody Maker'''s journalist Steve Sutherland once described her as "the voice of God". She was described by critic Jason Ankeny as "an utterly unique performer whose swooping, operatic vocals relied less on any recognizable language than on the subjective sounds and textures of verbalized emotions".

Biography
Early years
Fraser was born and grew up in Grangemouth, which she described as "a dark and stifling industrial town". Her mother worked in a factory. She was the youngest of six children. During her teenage years, she developed eating disorders and became bulimic. In 1996, Fraser revealed that she was sexually abused by a brother-in-law and possibly her father, and that at 16 she was forced to leave the family house for having a punk look. Music was important and represented an escape; at that time Fraser had portraits of her heroes like Siouxsie Sioux tattooed on her arms. She met her partner Robin Guthrie at 17; "What brought us together was me having no ideas and opinions of my own, and him having plenty – enough for both of us. We were attracted to each other for the wrong reasons".

Cocteau Twins (1981–1997)

Fraser then became the vocalist and lyricist in Cocteau Twins in 1981, (a group founded in 1979 by Guthrie and Will Heggie): they spotted her dancing at a club one night, and asked her to join their band. At the time, she was 17 years old, and had never thought of herself as a singer. After an on-off phase, the band recorded some tracks which were sent as demos to John Peel and Ivo Watts-Russell of 4AD which led to their signing by the London-based label and a successful career in music. Fraser and Guthrie formed a relationship, and in 1989 had a daughter, Lucy Belle. Guthrie liberally used alcohol and drugs throughout the years they were together, and Fraser had a nervous breakdown during the recording of Four-Calendar Café. The couple broke up in 1993, but opted to continue a musical relationship mostly due to contractual obligations until 1998, when Cocteau Twins were finally disbanded.

Fraser had a relationship with singer Jeff Buckley and recorded a duet with him, "All Flowers in Time Bend Towards the Sun", written together but never released commercially. She speaks about their relationship in the BBC documentary, Jeff Buckley: Everybody Here Wants You.

Collaborations and guest appearances
While working as part of Cocteau Twins, Fraser also collaborated with numerous artists. She appeared on 4AD house band This Mortal Coil's first release (along with her Cocteau Twins bandmates) where her contributions included a cover version of Tim Buckley's "Song to the Siren". She provided one-off vocals for acts such as Felt (Primitive Painters), Dif Juz (Extractions LP), The Wolfgang Press, and Ian McCulloch (Candleland and Mysterio).

Fraser has sporadically collaborated with a range of performers, including The Future Sound of London (Lifeforms EP), Elliot Goldenthal, Craig Armstrong (The Space Between Us) and Peter Gabriel (the millennium project OVO). Apart from her Cocteau Twins work she is probably best known for her collaborations with Massive Attack, having recorded three songs for the band's Mezzanine album in 1998 (including the international hit single "Teardrop", on which she replaced the original choice of Madonna), and subsequently toured with the band in 2006, and again in 2018–2019. She has also contributed to the soundtracks of several films including In Dreams, Cruel Intentions, The Winter Guest, The Lord of the Rings: The Fellowship of the Ring and The Lord of the Rings: The Two Towers, and occasionally appeared as a guest artist on other musicians' projects. In 2005, she appeared on Yann Tiersen's album Les Retrouvailles, singing on two pieces: "Kala" and "Mary".

Billy Howerdel envisioned Fraser as his first option for A Perfect Circle's lead singer, but she was unavailable for the project. Fraser also rejected a collaboration request from Linkin Park. Fraser appeared as a guest artist on folk singer Sam Lee's single "The Moon Shines Bright", released in December 2019, and subsequently on Sam Lee's album Old Wow, released in January 2020. She sings a fragment of lyrics from a traditional Scottish folk song "Wild Mountain Thyme". Under the project Sun's Signature with her partner Damon Reece, Fraser was set to release a self-titled extended-play album on 23 April 2022, via Rough Trade Records. It was later announced the album would be released on 18 June via Partisan Records, with the single "Golden Air" released on 6 April.

Solo career
Fraser's solo career has been intermittent, featuring guest appearances with other artists, and rare solo releases and live appearances. In 2000, a white label recording, "Underwater", was released in a limited edition of 200 copies. She contributed a cover version of "At Last I Am Free" (originally by '70s band Chic, covered by Robert Wyatt) on the 2003 album Stop Me If You Think You've Heard This One Before, a celebration of 25 years of Rough Trade Records. In 2004, she was invited to participate in an audio exhibit, Shhh..., at London's Victoria and Albert Museum for which she produced a piece called "Expectant Mood", which has not been made commercially available.

She was reportedly signed to Blanco y Negro Records. In December 2006, NME reported that her solo album was due for release in early 2007. The album would have contained eight tracks, one of which was to be a cover version. No titles were announced and the album was not released in 2007 as suggested. In June 2012, extracts from the as-yet unreleased album were played on BBC Radio 4.

In November 2009, Fraser released a solo single, "Moses", available on 12" and download through Rough Trade. The single was recorded with Damon Reece and Jake Drake-Brockman, and was a memorial to the latter.

In August 2012, Fraser performed at Royal Festival Hall for two nights as part of the Meltdown Festival at London's Southbank Centre, curated by Anohni. Prior to the concerts she confirmed that she had assembled an album's worth of material and would showcase these at the event in addition to performing re-interpretations of some Cocteau Twins songs. She also referred to the physical exertion involved in her singing against the wall of sound in many of the Cocteau Twins songs, of which she said it was "like an endurance test. I don't intend to do that again. I've been using my voice more gently." Prior to her appearance at Meltdown, she played a warm-up concert at Bath Pavilion on 4 August.

In addition to Damon Reece on drums and percussion, Fraser's backing band featured three other former or current members of Spiritualized – Sean Cook (guitar), Martin Shellard (guitar), Thighpaulsandra (keyboards) – and two backing vocalists (Jo Goldsmith-Eteson and Lucy Potterton, both from The Swingle Singers).'LIVE REPORT: Elizabeth Fraser' by Chris Roberts, 'The Quietus', 9 August 2012.

Sky Arts' 2016 drama series The Nightmare Worlds of H. G. Wells carried a score composed by Fraser and Reece. Also in 2016, she collaborated with The Insects on the soundtrack to the BBC TV series The Living and The Dead. She could be heard singing "She Moves Through the Fair" in episode 1, and "The Lover's Ghost" over the end titles in episode 4. The soundtrack has been made available as a digital download.

Fraser made a rare appearance at the Royal Albert Hall on 23 July 2017, in conversation with John Grant. They discussed the Cocteau Twins 1988 album, Blue Bell Knoll, with all proceeds from the show going to gay rights charity Stonewall. During the conversation, Fraser responded to a question from the audience about a possible collaboration with John Grant, saying "He doesn't need to persuade me!" Speaking of her insecurity about recording and performing, Fraser said "I get it in the studio, it's a horror, but it's part of the journey ... I don't think I was confident, especially when I stopped singing. That's when the voice kicks in, really nagging you, telling you what a horrible person you are and 'what do you think you're doing'. But then you sing and it shuts up that voice, the other voice is louder … "

On 3 September 2018, Fraser performed an intimate invitation only performance at the "Society of the Golden Slippers" showcase in Soho where she was joined by John Grant on harmonies for "Oh Shenandoah".

Sun's Signature (2022–present)

In June 2022, Fraser, as part of Sun's Signature with partner Damon Reece, released the extended play entitled Sun's Signature via Partisan Records. The duo have also provided the soundtrack for Graham Duff’s TV miniseries The Nightmare World of H.G. Wells. The release of the EP marked Fraser's first release in thirteen years according to Rolling Stone.

Artistry
Fraser's lyrics with many of the Cocteau Twins's songs range from straightforward English to semi-comprehensible sentences and abstract mouth music. For some recordings, she has said she used foreign words without knowing what they meant – the words acquired meaning for her only as she sang them. She has a soprano vocal range.

Personal life
Fraser lives with her partner, musician Damon Reece (from the band Lupine Howl), in Bristol. She has two daughters, the first by her former partner Robin Guthrie and the second by Reece.

Discography
With Cocteau Twins

 Garlands (1982)
 Head over Heels (1983)
 Treasure (1984)
 Victorialand (1986)
 Blue Bell Knoll (1988)
 Heaven or Las Vegas (1990)
 Four-Calendar Café (1993)
 Milk & Kisses (1996)

As main artist
Singles
1983: "Song to the Siren" (with This Mortal Coil) – UK No. 66  – (4AD) 
2000: "Underwater" (Blanco Y Negro) 
2009: "Moses" (Rough Trade)

 With Sun's Signature 

 Singles 

2022: "Golden Air" (Partisan Records) 

 EP Sun's Signature'' (Partisan Records)

Guest appearances

References

External links
 Official website

1963 births
Living people
Women rock singers
People from Grangemouth
4AD artists
Scottish sopranos
Cocteau Twins members
20th-century Scottish women singers
21st-century Scottish women singers